Tony Imi BSC (27 March 1937 – 8 March 2010) was a British motion picture and television cinematographer. He was born in London, England.

Filmography
Up the Junction (1965)
 Cathy Come Home (1966)
Inadmissible Evidence (1968)
Universal Soldier (1971)
The Raging Moon (1971)
Elephant Boy (1973) TV Series
Edward the King (1975) (mini) TV Series
The Firefighters (1975)
The Likely Lads (1976)
The Slipper and the Rose (1976)
Robin Hood Junior (1977)
That's Carry On! (1977)
International Velvet (1978)
North Sea Hijack (1979)
The Sea Wolves (1980)
A Tale of Two Cities (1980) (TV)
Night Crossing (1981) (director of photography)
The Life and Adventures of Nicholas Nickleby (1982) (mini) TV Series
The Third Reich (1982) (TV)
My Body, My Child (1982) (TV)
Savage Islands (1983)
A Christmas Carol (1984) (TV)
Enemy Mine (1985)
Reunion at Fairborough (1985)
Oceans of Fire (1986) (TV)
Empire State (1987)
The Return of Sherlock Holmes (1987) (TV)
Buster (1988)
Babycakes (1989) (TV)
Wired (1989)
The Old Man and the Sea (1990) (TV)
Fire Birds (1990)
Coins in the Fountain (1990) (TV)
Child of Rage (1992) (TV)
Scarlett (1994) (mini) TV series
Shopping (1994)
The Sunshine Boys (1996) (TV)
Aimée & Jaguar (1999)
Silent Cry (2002)
Chaos and Cadavers (2003)
Lighthouse Hill (2004)
Survival Island (2005)
The Shell Seekers (2006) (TV)
Candles on Bay Street (2006) (TV)
Victims (2006)

References

External links 

 The British Society of Cinematographers
 Obituary in The Telegraph
 Obituary in The Guardian

1937 births
2010 deaths
English cinematographers
Film people from London